Lake Lovozero is located on the Kola Peninsula, in Murmansk Oblast within the Barents Sea basin and ensures runoff from the river Voronya. Area: 200 km², average depth is 5.7 metres, maximal 35 m. Annual fluctuations do not exceed 1 m, and the average period of water renewal is about 10 months. The lake has a winding coastline and many peninsulas and islands. The area surrounding the lake, e.g. the Lovozerskiye Tundras is commonly known as "Ловозёрье" in Russian (Lovozerye, Lovozyorye).

In 1970, two hydroelectric power plants were built on the Voronya River at Serebryansk, about 100 kilometers downstream from the lake. The dam at the power plant created a reservoir on the Voronya with the same waterlevel as Lake Lovozero, effectively turning the two bodies of water into one.

References
 The role of the lake in Murmansk Oblast

Lakes of Murmansk Oblast
LLovozero

no:Lovozero